The Newfoundland Hockey League or Newfoundland Senior Hockey League (NSHL) was an island-wide league of senior hockey teams in Newfoundland that was founded in 1962. James J. Tobin was awarded the position of Honorary Secretary by the league for his contributions to hockey and sport in general, and held this position for more than 40 years. Champions are awarded the Herder Memorial Trophy. 

The league was disbanded after the 1988-89 season with teams deep in debt and American Hockey League teams flooded the market.  

On September 10, 2011, it was announced that a re-incarnation of the Newfoundland Senior Hockey League would start in the fall of 2011, seeing two teams from the AESHL (Conception Bay North Cee Bee Stars and Mount Pearl HJ Bartlett Electric Blades) combining with three teams from the WCSHL (Clarenville Caribous, Grand Falls-Windsor Cataracts and Corner Brook Royals).

Currently there are two regional senior A leagues, the Central West Senior Hockey League (CWSHL) and the Avalon East Senior Hockey League (AESHL). The league champions will compete for the all-Newfoundland senior hockey championship in March 2016 in a best-of-five series.

NSHL Seasons

Trophies and awards

Note: Trophy's first season being awarded in brackets.

Team
Herder Memorial Trophy - Playoff Champions (1934-35)
Evening Telegram Trophy - Regular Season Champions (1962-63)

Player
S. E Tuma Memorial Trophy - Top Scorer in Regular Season (1968-69)
T.A. (Gus) Soper Memorial Award - MVP in Regular Season (1980-81)
Cliff Gorman Memorial Award - Playoff MVP
Hockey NL President's Goaltender's Award - Top Goaltender (1988-89)
Albert "Peewee" Crane Memorial Trophy - Rookie of the Year (1968-69)
Howie Clouter Memorial Trophy - Most Gentlemanly and Effective Player (1973-74)
Top Defenseman
Coach of the Year

Trophy and award winners 1962-1989
Note: n/a = not awarded that season

References

Bibliography

Defunct ice hockey leagues in Newfoundland and Labrador